

145001–145100 

|-id=062
| 145062 Hashikami ||  || Hashikami, Japan, the hometown of the father of the discoverer, Kin Endate || 
|-id=075
| 145075 Zipernowsky ||  || Károly Zipernowsky (1853–1942), a Hungarian electrical engineer and a pioneer of AC technologies || 
|}

145101–145200 

|-id=166
| 145166 Leojematt || 2005 JL || Leo Rodriguez (born 2021), Jemma Osmonson (born 2021) and Matthew Young (born 2021) are great-grandchildren of American astronomer James Whitney Young, who discovered this minor planet. || 
|}

145201–145300 

|-bgcolor=#f2f2f2
| colspan=4 align=center | 
|}

145301–145400 

|-bgcolor=#f2f2f2
| colspan=4 align=center | 
|}

145401–145500 

|-id=445
| 145445 Le Floch || 2005 RS || Jean-Christophe Le Floch (born 1965), French amateur astronomer who observes at the observatories of Bordeaux, Meudon, Haute-Provence and Pic du Midi || 
|-id=475
| 145475 Rehoboth ||  || Rehoboth Christian School, New Mexico, whose campus is the site of the Calvin-Rehoboth Robotic Observatory (the discovery site) || 
|-id=488
| 145488 Kaczendre ||  || Endre Kacz Komáromi (1880–1969) was a Hungarian painter and amateur astronomer. From the 1910s, he had permanent exhibitions in Budapest and several of his paintings can be found in the Hungarian National Gallery. His colorful drawings of planets are unique, and he was an independent discoverer of N Aql 1918. || 
|}

145501–145600 

|-id=523
| 145523 Lulin ||  || Lulin mountain, Taiwan, where the discovery site (the National Central University Lu-Lin Observatory) is located || 
|-id=534
| 145534 Jhongda || 2006 GJ || Jhongda, in Mandarin Chinese an abbreviation for "Central University", which built and operates the discovery site (the National Central University Lu-Lin Observatory) || 
|-id=545
| 145545 Wensayling ||  || Sayling Wen (1948–2003), Chinese educator and promoter for social work || 
|-id=546
| 145546 Suiqizhong ||  || Guangzhou Middle School, in Guangzhou, China, where the co-discoverer of this minor planet, Ye Quan-Zhi, has studied || 
|-id=558
| 145558 Raiatea || 2006 OR || The island of Raiatea in French Polynesia, the first of the Polynesian islands to be inhabited || 
|-id=559
| 145559 Didiermüller ||  || Didier Müller (born 1967), a Swiss math and computer science teacher, who has written several books on science popularization (Src, HP) || 
|-id=562
| 145562 Zurbriggen ||  || Bernard Zurbriggen (born 1943), Swiss emeritus professor of natural science, director of the Observatory Naef Épendes, where this minor planet was discovered || 
|-id=566
| 145566 Andreasphilipp ||  || Andreas Philipp (born 1965), German amateur astronomer and founder of the Schurwaldsternwarte in Aichwald || 
|-id=588
| 145588 Sudongpo ||  || Su Shi (1037–1101), a Chinese writer, poet, painter, calligrapher, who composed numerous poems || 
|-id=593
| 145593 Xántus ||  || János Xántus (1825–1894), a Hungarian scientist, traveler, ethnographer and a member of the Hungarian Academy of Sciences. || 
|}

145601–145700 

|-bgcolor=#f2f2f2
| colspan=4 align=center | 
|}

145701–145800 

|-id=709
| 145709 Rocknowar ||  || "Rock No War", an international humanitarian aid organization of volunteers for children. It is based in Formigine, Italy, and was founded in 1998. || 
|-id=732
| 145732 Kanmon ||  || Kanmon Straits (Kanmon-kaikyō) in Japan, a strait separating the main islands of Honshu and Kyushu || 
|-id=768
| 145768 Petiška ||  || Eduard Petiška (1924–1987), a Czech poet, novelist, short story writer, playwright and translator || 
|}

145801–145900 

|-id=820
| 145820 Valeromeo ||  || Valentina Romeo (born 1980), Italian singer and friend of the discoverer Gianluca Masi || 
|}

145901–146000 

|-id=962
| 145962 Lacchini ||  || Giovanni Battista Lacchini (1884–1967), an Italian astronomer, noted for his work on variable stars. || 
|}

References 

145001-146000